Lidija Horvat (born 5 May 1982) is a Croatian handball player, who currently plays for the Romanian club Rapid Bucuresti and for the Croatia women's national handball team.

She played on the Croatian team at the 2008 European Women's Handball Championship, where Croatia finished 6th, and at the 2012 Summer Olympics, where Croatia finished in 7th.

In June 2015, she transferred to the Trabzon-based Turkish club Zağnos SK to play in the Turkish Women's Handball Super League.

References

1982 births
Living people
Croatian female handball players
Olympic handball players of Croatia
Handball players at the 2012 Summer Olympics
Handball players from Zagreb
Croatian expatriate sportspeople in Turkey
Expatriate handball players in Turkey
Zağnos SK (women's handball) players
Croatian expatriate sportspeople in France
RK Podravka Koprivnica players
21st-century Croatian women